Sorga Theevu (lit. Heavenly Island) is a novel by Indian writer Sujatha published in the early 1970s. It was the first science fiction novel written by him, and one of the earliest science fiction works in Tamil language.

References 

1970s science fiction novels
Tamil novels
1970 Indian novels
Indian science fiction novels
20th-century Indian novels